Eilema sanguicosta is a moth of the subfamily Arctiinae. It was described by George Hampson in 1901. It is found in the Democratic Republic of the Congo, Kenya, Malawi and Zimbabwe.

References

 

sanguicosta
Moths described in 1901